A magmatic lull is a period of declined magmatic activity in volcanically active regions. They may occur as a result of underthrusting of hinterland lithosphere beneath a volcanic arc, changes in subduction parameters such as relative velocity, direction and slab dip (e.g. flat slab subduction), arc-arc collisions and subduction hinge advance. Individual magmatic lulls may last tens of millions of years between periods of volcanicity.

A volcanic gap is a magmatic lull that separates two distinct volcanic zones. For example, the Andean Volcanic Belt of South America has three major volcanic gaps: the Peruvian flat-slab segment (3 °S–15 °S), the Pampean flat-slab segment (27 °S–33 °S) and the Patagonian Volcanic Gap (46 °S–49 °S).

References

Volcanology